Donal Boylan is a former Gaelic footballer, who played for the Derry county team, as well as an Australian rules footballer.

Playing career
The Glenullin GAC clubman represented Derry GAA at underage level and played senior football for Derry in the 2001 National Football League (Ireland) campaign. Boylan played Full-forward for the Ireland national Australian rules football team, that won the 2002 Australian Football International Cup.

References 

Living people
Year of birth missing (living people)
Derry inter-county Gaelic footballers
Gaelic footballers who switched code
Glenullin Gaelic footballers
Irish expatriate sportspeople in Australia
Irish players of Australian rules football